Ethel Margaret Arnold (bapt. 26 May 1865  – 5 October 1930) was an English journalist, author, and lecturer on female suffrage.

Life

Arnold was born in 1865, the youngest of eight surviving children of Tom Arnold, a professor of literature, and Julia Sorrell. Her uncle was the poet Matthew Arnold and her grandfather Thomas Arnold, the famous headmaster of Rugby School. One of her sisters became the novelist Mary Augusta Ward. Another sister was Julia and she married Leonard Huxley, and their sons were Julian and Aldous Huxley. The Arnolds and the Huxleys were important members of British intelligentsia.

Arnold's father had return to Australia after converting to Catholicism and finding it impossible to work. He worked in Ireland but by 1865 he had renounced Catholicism and returned to being an Anglican. This was a great relief to his wife and the family moved to Oxford where her father thrived.

She met Lewis Carroll as a child and she and her sister featured in a number of his photographs. For Christmas in 1877, Lewis Carroll devised the word game of Doublets for Julia and Ethel. The game was later published by Vanity Fair and by Carroll. Ethel later reported that she enjoyed the attention of having her photo taken as it was a break from her less than happy homelife. Arnold was to remain friends with Lewis Carroll when she was still an adult.

Ethel failed to gain a university place and she seems to have placed too much weight on her sister Mary's opinion. Mary persuaded her that her ambition to be an actress should not be pursued and she later said that Ethel had insufficient experience to be a successful writer. This was despite Ethel already having a commission for a novel.

Arnold took a late interest in writing between 1890 and 1900 but she spent a lot of her energy in speaking tours where she would address the issue of gaining women the vote. She wrote 400 book reviews for British newspapers and her one novel "Platonics" was said to be "promising" when it was published in 1896. The novel included a lesbian attraction which is resolved when one of them is attracted to a man. Arnold moved on from writing to take an interest in photography. She studied at the Regent Street Polytechnic in 1898 and obtained skilful results.

In 1909 she started a lecture tour of the United States. She spoke at Carnegie Hall filling the orchestra pit and her talks were well received. She returned in 1910 offering a wide range of talks on her notable ancestors and child humorists like Lewis Carroll. She spoke in St. Louis on April 11 at the invitation of Amabel Anderson Arnold and others. The St Louis Equal Suffrage League cited her talk as the inspiration for the organisation's formation.

Arnold died in Totland on the Isle of Wight in 1930.

References

1865 births
1930 deaths
British journalists
British lesbian writers
English suffragists
British women writers
People from Harborne